Carl Pack (January 25, 1899 – August 7, 1945) was an American lawyer and politician from New York.

Life
He was born on January 25, 1899, in Worcester, Massachusetts. He graduated LL.B. from Brooklyn Law School in 1920, was admitted to the bar in 1921, and graduated LL.M. from Brooklyn Law School in 1922.

Pack was a member of the New York State Assembly (Bronx Co., 3rd D.) in 1931, 1932, 1933, 1934, 1935, 1936, 1937 and 1938.

He was a member of the New York State Senate from 1939 until his death in 1945, sitting in the 162nd, 163rd, 164th and 165th New York State Legislatures.

He died on August 7, 1945, in New York City.

Sources

1899 births
1945 deaths
Democratic Party New York (state) state senators
Democratic Party members of the New York State Assembly
Politicians from Worcester, Massachusetts
Brooklyn Law School alumni
20th-century American politicians
Politicians from the Bronx